All the Way is the debut studio album from sibling duo Vincent and Reggie Calloway, better known as Calloway.  Released in 1989, the album contained their biggest pop hit in the track "I Wanna Be Rich", which reached number two on the Billboard Hot 100.  The song also became their biggest R&B/soul hit, peaking at number 5. The ballad "You Are My Everything", on the other hand, was the most successful song of the duo in Asia, particularly in the Philippines during the early 1990s.

Track listing
All songs written by Vincent and Reggie Calloway, except where noted.

"Sir Lancelot" 5:50
"I Wanna Be Rich" (Reggie Calloway, Vincent Calloway, Melvin Gentry, Belinda Lipscomb) 5:08
"Love Circles" 6:34
"Freaks Compete" 5:16
"You Are My Everything" 4:28
"All the Way" 6:50
"I Want You" 5:06
"Sugar Free" 4:44
"You Can Count on Me" 4:46
"Holiday" 4:50

Personnel

Calloway
Reggie Calloway: Vocals, Flute, Flugelhorn, Drum Programming
Vincent Calloway: Vocals, Trombone, Flugelhorn, Keyboards, Vocoder, Drum Programming

Additional personnel
Rasheeda Azar: Vocals
D'LaVance, Donnell Spencer Jr., Keith John, Kipper Jones, Valerie K. Watson: Vocal Backing
Charles Fearing, Gene Robinson, Kane Roberts, Paul Jackson Jr.: Guitars
Derek Nakamoto, Odeen Mays, Randy Kerber: Keyboards
Chuckii Booker, Jeff Lorber: Keyboards, Drum Programming
Joel Davis: Keyboards, Vocal Backing 
Todd Herreman: Additional Programming
Michael Sharfe, Freddie Washington: Bass
Kenny Bobinger, Carlos Vega: Drums
Paulinho da Costa, Tim Cornwell: Percussion
Gerald Albright: Saxophone
George Bohanon: Trombone

Production
Arranged and produced by Calloway
Recording Engineers: Craig Burbidge, David Koenig, Donnie Kraft, Elliot Peters, Jeff Lorber, Jim Krause, Rob Chicarelli, Rob Seifert, Robin Jenney
Assistant Recording Engineers: Andy Batwinas, Gregg Darrett, Jackie Forsting, Kimm James, Mike Scotella, Neal H. Pogue, Sylvia Massy
Mixed by Barney Perkins, Craig Burbidge, Keith Cohen and Taavi Mote

References

1989 debut albums
Epic Records albums
Contemporary R&B albums by American artists